Topeka is the capital city of the U.S. state of Kansas.

Topeka may also refer to:

Places
United States
 Topeka, Illinois
 Topeka, Indiana
 Topeka, Mississippi

Libraries
 Topeka & Shawnee County Public Library, in Topeka, Kansas

Schools
 Topeka High School, in Topeka, Kansas

Ships
 USS Topeka, one of three United States Navy ships
 MS Topeka or German night fighter direction vessel Togo, a merchant vessel

Other
 Topeka (store), a chain of stores in Puerto Rico
 Topeka Zoo, in Topeka, Kansas
 Topeka (film), a 1953 American Western
 Topeka (Google hoax), the 2010 April Fool's Day version of Google